Aminur Rahman (born 18 June 1994) is a Bangladeshi footballer who plays as a striker. He currently plays for and captains Muktijoddha SKC in the Bangladesh Premier League.

International goals

U23
Scores and results list Bangladesh's goal tally first.

References 

1994 births
Living people
Bangladeshi footballers
Bangladesh international footballers
Bangladesh youth international footballers
Association football forwards
Place of birth missing (living people)
Footballers at the 2014 Asian Games
Feni SC players
Team BJMC players
Abahani Limited (Dhaka) players
Sheikh Russel KC players
Mohammedan SC (Dhaka) players
Muktijoddha Sangsad KC players
Asian Games competitors for Bangladesh
Bangladesh Football Premier League players